Old Oklahoma Plains is a 1952 American Western film directed by William Witney and written by Milton Raison. The film stars Rex Allen, Slim Pickens, Elaine Edwards, Roy Barcroft, John Crawford and Joel Marston. The film was released on July 25, 1952, by Republic Pictures.

Plot

Cast
Rex Allen as Rex Allen
Koko as Koko
Slim Pickens as Slim
Elaine Edwards as Terry Ramsey
Roy Barcroft as Arthur Jensen
John Crawford as Chuck Ramsey
Joel Marston as Lieutenant Spike Connors
Russell Hicks as Colonel Charles Bigelow
Fred Graham as Henchman Cameron
Stephen Chase as General William Parker
The Republic Rhythm Riders as Cowhands

References

External links 
 

1952 films
American Western (genre) films
1952 Western (genre) films
Republic Pictures films
Films directed by William Witney
American black-and-white films
1950s English-language films
1950s American films